In organic chemistry, anilides (or phenylamides) are a class of organic compounds with the general structure . They are amide derivatives of aniline.

Preparation
Aniline reacts with acyl chlorides or carboxylic anhydrides to give anilides.  For example, reaction of aniline with acetyl chloride provides acetanilide.  At high temperatures, aniline and carboxylic acids react to give anilides.

Uses
 Herbicides
 Fungicides - Oxycarboxin, Carboxin

References

External links